Syd Carpenter (born 1953) is an African American artist known for her ceramic and sculpture work. She received a Pew Fellowship and her work is currently in the Smithsonian Institution's collection and the Philadelphia Museum of Art's collection.

Early life and education

In 1953, Carpenter was born in Pittsburgh, Pennsylvania.  She earned her Bachelors of Fine Art in 1974 and Master in Fine Art in 1976 from the Tyler School of Art and Architecture.

Career
In 1991, Carpenter began teaching at Swarthmore College as a Professor of Studio Art, where she would teach until her retirement in the fall of 2022, resulting in the college no longer offering ceramic classes. At Swarthmore, she was appointed to the Endowed Peggy Chan Professorship of Black Studies in January 2021. In 1992, she was awarded the Pew Fellowship in the Arts. 

In 2014, Carpenter's exhibit "“Syd Carpenter: More Places of Our Own" was one of the two exhibits that the African American Museum in Philadelphia received a $50,000 award from the Knight Foundation to enhance. In 2021, Carpenter and artist Steve Donegan, designed and constructed "hugel mounds" at Woodmere Museum as environmental art pieces. From January - May 2022, her exhibit Earth Offerings: Honoring the Gardeners, inspired by the legacy of Black farmers, was displayed in the Rowan University Art Gallery. In May 2022, her work was acquired by the Smithsonian Institution for “This Present Moment: Crafting a Better World” exhibit.  In November 2022, Carpenter was named one of Anonymous Was a Woman (AWAW) 2022 award recipients, receiving $25,000. On December 16, 2022, Carptenter appeared in the award-winning documentary series, Craft in America episode "Home,” alongside artists Biskakone Greg Johnson, Wharton Esherick, and Sim Van der Ryn.

Collections
Carpenter's work is held in the permanent collections of the Smithsonian Institution, the Metropolitan Museum of Art, and the Philadelphia Museum of Art, among other instituions.

References 

Living people
1953 births
Pew Fellows in the Arts
People from Pittsburgh
Swarthmore College faculty
African-American artists
Ceramists
American sculptors